This is a list of technical death metal bands. Technical death metal (sometimes called tech-death) is a musical subgenre of death metal music that focuses on complex rhythms, riffs and song structures.

References

Lists of death metal bands